Jamia Salfia may refer to:

 Jamia Salafia, Varanasi, India
 Jamia Salafia, Faisalabad, Pakistan

See also
 
 Jamia 
 Salafi movement